Shona Campbell (born 7 June 2001) is a Scottish rugby player from Dundee who was selected for the Scotland Women's Six Nations squad in the 2021 Women's Six Nations Championship. She is also a touch rugby Gold Medallist for the Scottish team and has played netball for Scotland under 21s.

Club career 
Campbell plays full back and wing for Edinburgh University. She started playing rugby when she was five for Montrose, playing there until the age of 14, before taking a break to compete at a national level in netball.

International career 
Campbell played rugby for Scotland U18s 7s, with the team securing sixth place in the Rugby Europe 2019 Championship. 

She has also played touch rugby at a national level in the Scotland mixed open. In 2019, she was the youngest player to be selected for the adult's mixed team at 17 years old. She travelled with them to play in the World Cup finals in Malaysia, where the team were Bronze Medalists. Two years prior to that, she played for the Scottish Under 18s touch rugby team, competing in the Junior Touch Rugby European Championships in Dublin. In the 2019 European Touch Rugby Championships she was part of the winning team and was named junior female player of the year. 

She was called up for Scotland's 2021 Women's Six Nations Squad. Gordon Lyon, who has helped coach her at Edinburgh University, commented on her call-up, “Shona is one of the most exciting players we have seen in Scotland for a while... She is a very balanced runner and can find space like no other - I reckon she could easily sidestep a player in a telephone box!"

Personal life 
Campbell is a student at Edinburgh University. She attended the High School of Dundee and was awarded the schools' "Sports Personality of the Year" award for featuring in the Scotland mixed open adult team that won bronze at the Touch Rugby World Cup. 

She played netball for Scotland U17, U21 and Edinburgh University, before switching to the University rugby team to train for the Six Nations.

Honours 

 Touch Rugby Bronze Medalists, Mixed Open Touch World Cup 2020
Touch Rugby European Gold Medalists 2019 
European Junior female player of the year 2019

References

External links 

 Women's Club Rugby Profile Page

Living people
2001 births
People educated at the High School of Dundee
Scotland women's international rugby union players
Rugby sevens players at the 2022 Commonwealth Games